Abdullahi Mahadi (December 1945 – 16 December 2022) was a historian, educationist, and former Vice-Chancellor of Ahmadu Bello University Zaria, Gombe state University, and Gombe State University of Science and Technology.

Early life and education
Abdullahi Mahadi was born in 1945, in Gwoza, Borno State, where he started his elementary school at Warrabe Primary School. He enrolled at Gwoza Central School for his secondary education, and then Government Craft School, Maiduguri. He proceeded to Mubi Teachers’ College for his teaching training before gaining admission in to  Ahmadu Bello University, Zaria for his Bachelor's degree in History, M.Sc. and Ph.D. in the same field. He also authored 47 books and journals.

Career
He started his career in 1967 as an Assistant Headmaster of Gadamayo Primary School, Gwoza. He was promoted to the position of a Headmaster and transferred to Hambagda Primary School in 1968, and Assistant Education Officer, North-Eastern Government in 1971. In 1984, he joined Ahmadu Bello University as a Senior lecturer in History and subsequently Director of Northern History Research Scheme, an institute within Ahmadu Bello University.

In 1987, he was appointed Vice-Chancellor, Ahmadu Bello University, Zaria before joining Gombe State University as the pioneer Vice-Chancellor, 2004. In 2017, he was appointed by the Ibrahim Hassan Dankwambo as the pioneer Vice-Chancellor.

Death 

Mahadi died in Gombe on December 16, 2022. Aged 77. His funeral prayer according to Islamic rites took place at the Gombe Central Masjid, emir's palace Gombe.

Reference 

1945 births
2022 deaths
Ahmadu Bello University alumni
People from Borno State
Nigerian historians
Vice-Chancellors by university in Nigeria